The women's doubles badminton event at the 2017 Summer Universiade was held from August 27 to 29 at the Taipei Gymnasium in Taipei, Taiwan.

Draw

Finals

Top half

Section 1

Section 2 

w/o: Walkover.

Section 3

Section 4

Bottom half

Section 5

Section 6 

RET: Retired.

Section 7

Section 8

References 
 Results Bracket

Women's doubles
Univ